The Nikon D700 is a professional-grade full-frame digital single-lens reflex camera introduced by the Nikon Corporation in July 2008 and manufactured in Japan. It uses the same 12.1-megapixel "FX" CMOS image sensor as the Nikon D3, and is Nikon's second full-frame digital SLR camera.

The D700's full-frame sensor allows the use of F-mount (FX) lenses to their fullest advantage, with almost no crop factor. When a cropped DX lens is mounted on the D700, either the DX-sized portion, or the (vignetted) FX-sized portion of the camera's sensor can be used. The D700 has a built in autofocus motor for all Nikon autofocus-lenses, includes CPU and metering for older Nikon F-mount AI/AI-S lenses, and supports PC-E lenses. The D700 bears a physical similarity to the Nikon D300, which uses the same MB-D10 battery pack and EN-EL3e battery. It was discontinued on August 24, 2012.

Features
 Nikon's 12.1 megapixel FX-format (23.9 mm × 36 mm) CMOS sensor
 Nikon EXPEED image processor
 Two Live View shooting mode (hand-held and tripod modes)
 Continuous Drive up to 5 frames per second (8 frames per second with the optional MB-D10 Multi-power Battery Pack, BL-3 Battery Chamber Cover, and EN-EL4a battery from the Nikon D3 & D3S)
 Nikon's Scene Recognition System, utilizing the 1,005-pixel RGB sensor
 3D Color Matrix Metering II
 Approx. 95% Viewfinder Frame Coverage, 0.72× Viewfinder Magnification
 Multi-CAM 3500FX autofocus sensor module featuring 51 AF points with 3D Focus Tracking
 Electronic rangefinder function compatible with manual focus AI/AIs lenses using any of the 51 AF points
 Active D-Lighting (3 levels (Low; Normal; High) or Auto)
 Automatic correction of lateral chromatic aberration for JPEGs; correction data is additionally stored in RAW-files and can be used by Nikon Capture NX, View NX and some other RAW tools
 Vignetting ("Vignette control") correction, as well as image rotation ("Straighten") via playback ("Retouch") menu
  LCD with 921,600-dot (VGA) resolution and a 170° ultra-wide viewing angle
 ISO sensitivity 200–6400 (100–25600 with boost)
 Auto-ISO function which can be capped with a maximum shutter time and maximum ISO value
 Magnesium alloy weather sealed body for dust and moisture protection
 Nikon F-mount lenses
 9 Lens presets per user profile to improve program functions for non-CPU lenses and to include Exif information
 Aperture sensing ring on the body for readout of AI/AIs manual focus lens aperture settings
 Built-in Sensor cleaning system
 Built-in flash with 24 mm lens coverage and Nikon's i-TTL flash control; the guide number is 12m at ISO 100
 Support for the Wireless Transmitter WT-4/4A
 File formats include: JPEG, TIFF (RGB), NEF (Nikon's raw image format compressed and uncompressed)
 HDMI HD video output
 Approx. mass 
 EN-EL3e Lithium-ion Batteries (same as D80, D90, D200, D300, D300S), Battery Life (shots per charge): 1000 shots (CIPA)
 Optional Multi-Power Battery Pack MB-D10 (same as D300 & D300S)
 GPS interface for direct geotagging supported by Nikon GP-1

Reception
The Nikon D700 has been tested by many independent reviewers and has generally received high marks. It achieved a top ranking in the DxOmark Sensor ranking and was, as of November 2011, ranked ninth behind the Nikon D3, Nikon D3S, Nikon D3X, four medium format cameras and the APS-C sized Pentax K-5.

The camera received several awards, including a Digital Photography Review "Highly Recommended" award.

Legacy
In the years following its release, the D700 has retained its status as a capable camera, and has established itself a legend in the world of digital photography. As of 2020, many prominent photography outlets continue to praise the D700. In recent years, and unlike any other DSLR, further and updated reviews have been published, YouTube videos uploaded, with web forums, entire websites, and social media pages dedicated and updated at a regular rate, solely for and about the D700. Further affirming its continued relevance, many professionals still consider it their main camera for project or personal work, and a backup for professional engagements. The D700 is considered by many as an icon.

References

External links

 Nikon D700 – Nikon global website
 Nikon D700 – Nikon USA website
 Nikon D700 Sample Photos at Pbase.com
 Nikon D700 Review at Digital Photography Review

D700
D700
Live-preview digital cameras
Cameras introduced in 2008
Full-frame DSLR cameras